The Leeds City Council elections were held on Thursday, 7 May 1987, with one third of the council and a vacancy in Wetherby to be elected. Prior to the election, the Alliance had gained the Aireborough seat from the Conservatives in a by-election.

An upsurge in turnout brought with it a greater Conservative and Alliance vote, with a 3.5% swing from Labour to Conservative narrowing things back towards a three-way race. Despite the Conservatives managing to reverse much of their recent decline, they were still unable to win back Aireborough, or halt Alliance gains in Moortown and Horsforth, although running them close in the latter. They fared better in contests with Labour, defending their remaining seat in Morley North and getting within 192 votes of regaining Pudsey South. Labour also seen a strong challenge in Headingley from the Alliance, with their majority slashed to 320 votes. With the two gains achieved on the night by the Alliance from Tory, Labour's majority remained unchanged.

Election result

This result has the following consequences for the total number of seats on the council after the elections:

Ward results

References

1987 English local elections
1987
1980s in Leeds